Rick McClure is an American politician serving as a member of the Arkansas House of Representatives from the 26th district.

Career
McClure won the primary election for district 26 of the Arkansas House of Representatives on March 3, 2020, winning 2,392 votes to 1,120 to Lorna Nobles. McClure won the general election on November 3, 2020, winning 8,327 votes to 3,304 against Joyce Schimenti.

93rd Arkansas General Assembly
McClure began serving as a representative on January 11, 2021. During the 93rd Assembly, McClure served on the following committees:

 House Revenue and Taxation Committee
 Advanced Communications and Information Technology Committee
 Aging, Children and Youth, Legislative and Military Affairs Committee

McClure is running for re-election in 2022.

References

External links

Living people
21st-century American politicians
Republican Party members of the Arkansas House of Representatives
People from Malvern, Arkansas
Year of birth missing (living people)